Pinheads on the Move is a compilation album by the American post-punk band Tuxedomoon, released in 1987 by Cramboy. Containing recordings made between 1977 and 1983, the album comprises early singles, rehearsals, live recordings and other rarities. The CD issue has an abridged track listing, removing four songs from the album.

Track listing

Personnel 
Adapted from the Pinheads on the Move liner notes.

Tuxedomoon
 Steven Brown – alto saxophone, soprano saxophone, clarinet, keyboards, synthesizer, percussion, vocals
 Peter Dachert (as Peter Principle) – bass guitar, electric guitar, synthesizer, percussion, production
 Blaine L. Reininger – violin, viola, acoustic guitar, electric guitar, synthesizer, keyboards, percussion
 Winston Tong – vocals

Additional musicians
 Michael Belfer – guitar (B5, C2, D4)
 Greg Langston – drums (B1, B4), percussion (A5)
 Luc van Lieshout – trumpet (C6)
 Victoria Lowe – vocals (A2)
 Paul Zahl – drums (A3, A5)
Production and additional personnel
 Uri Barak – engineering
 Vincent Kenis – engineering
 Patrick Roques – cover art, design, photography
 Mark Sangerman – photography
 Tom Tadlock – production (A1-A3), recording (A6, C3, D1)

Release history

References

External links 
 

1987 compilation albums
Tuxedomoon albums
Crammed Discs compilation albums